Shigeto (written: , ,  or ) is a masculine Japanese given name. Notable people with the name include:

, Japanese physician
, Japanese linguist
, Japanese sport shooter
, Japanese footballer
, Japanese basketball player
, Japanese economist
Zachary Shigeto Saginaw, American musician

Shigetō or Shigetou is a separate given name, though it may be romanized the same way. Notable people with the name include:

, Imperial Japanese Navy admiral

See also 
Shigetō Station, a railway station in Kami, Kōchi Prefecture, Japan

Japanese masculine given names